The Special Inspector General for Afghanistan Reconstruction (SIGAR) is the U.S. government's leading oversight authority on Afghanistan reconstruction. Congress created the Office of the Special Inspector General for Afghanistan Reconstruction to provide independent and objective oversight of the Afghanistan Reconstruction funds. Under the authority of Section 1229 of the National Defense Authorization Act for Fiscal Year 2008 (PL 110-181), SIGAR conducts audit, inspections, and investigations to promote efficiency and effectiveness of reconstruction programs, and to detect and prevent waste, fraud, and abuse of taxpayer dollars. SIGAR also has a hotline that allows individuals to report suspected fraud.

Quarterly reports

Public Law 110-181 directs SIGAR to submit a quarterly report to Congress. This congressionally-mandated report summarizes SIGAR's audits and investigative activities. The report also provides an overview of reconstruction activities in Afghanistan and includes a detailed statement of all obligations, expenditures, and revenues associated with reconstruction.

As part of its legislative mandate, SIGAR tracks the status of U.S. funds appropriated, obligated, and disbursed for reconstruction activities in Afghanistan in the Quarterly Report. As of September 30, 2019, the United States had appropriated 
approximately $132.55 billion for relief and reconstruction in Afghanistan 
since FY 2002. These funds have been allocated into four major areas:
 $82.55 billion for security ($4.57 billion for counternarcotics initiatives)
 $34.46 billion for governance and development ($4.37 billion for counternarcotics initiatives)
 $3.85 billion for humanitarian aid
 $11.70 billion for civilian operations

History

Creation
The Special Inspector General for Afghanistan Reconstruction was created with the enactment of Public Law 110-181 when President George W. Bush signed H.R. 4986 on January 28, 2008.

Leadership

Inspector General: In 2012, President Barack Obama selected John F. Sopko to serve as the Special Inspector General. Sopko has more than 30 years of experience in oversight and investigations as a prosecutor, congressional counsel and senior federal government advisor. He came to SIGAR from Akin Gump Strauss Hauer & Feld LLP, an international law firm headquartered in Washington, D.C., where he had been a partner since 2009. Sopko's government experience includes over 20 years on Capitol Hill, where he held key positions in both the Senate and House of Representatives. He served on the staffs of the House Committee on Energy and Commerce, the Select Committee on Homeland Security and the Senate Permanent Subcommittee on Investigations.

The Inspector General post was previously held by Steve Trent (acting), Herb Richardson (acting), and Arnold Fields.

Since being appointed, Sopko has testified multiple times before Congress on behalf of SIGAR.

Deputy Inspector General: Gene Aloise joined SIGAR on September 4, 2012, as the Deputy Inspector General, he oversees day-to-day operations and assists the Inspector General in executing SIGAR's mission. Aloise came to SIGAR from the Government Accountability Office (GAO), where he served for 38 years. He has years of experience developing, leading, and managing GAO domestic and international work. His experience includes assignments with congressional committees as well as various offices within GAO.

Staffing and locations
According to the organization's October 2014 Report to Congress, SIGAR employed 197 federal employees. The report noted that SIGAR has 29 employees at the U.S. Embassy Kabul and eight other employees in Afghan locations outside the U.S. Embassy. SIGAR staff members were stationed at four locations across the country, including Kandahar and Bagram Airfields, Mazar-i-Sharif, and the U.S. Embassy Kabul. SIGAR employed three local Afghans in its Kabul office to support the Investigations and Audits directorates.

Recognitions
In October 2014, Over two dozen staffers of the Special Inspector General for Afghanistan Reconstruction (SIGAR), were recognized for outstanding achievements at the 17th Annual Inspector General Community awards ceremony. The awards included the Sentner award, two awards for audit excellence and two awards for excellence special act.
In October 2012, SIGAR Audit and Investigative Teams won CIGIE Awards for Excellence. The awards included the Sentner award, an award for audit excellence and an investigation award for excellence.
In May 2012, SIGAR special agents received a Public Service Award today from the U.S. Attorney's Office for the Eastern District of Virginia for their work in a major bribery case in Afghanistan.
In October 2011 a SIGAR audit team was presented the Sentner Award for Dedication and Courage for its work in Laghman Province auditing the Commander's Emergency Response Program. 
In October 2011 another SIGAR team won an Award for Excellence for its audit of Afghan National Security Force facilities.

Non-Governmental Organization (NGO) recognition & assistance

SIGAR, and its reports, findings and information, have also been widely discussed and distributed on Capitol Hill, the US Congress and with U.S. policymakers, by the Washington, D.C.-based Afghanistan Foundation, a non-profit public policy research organization (NGO). SIGAR's efforts have helped educated and inform policymakers in public policy research organizations, and think tanks, about issues regarding U.S. assistance programs, aid levels, and various projects, in Afghanistan, including problems of corruption in Afghanistan, the Kabul Bank crisis and other important matters.

Investigations
The Washington Post has filed FOIA lawsuits for government documents related to documents produced by the agency's Lessons Learned Program. While the legal matter is pending before Judge Amy Berman Jackson of the U.S. District Court in the District of Columbia, unedited transcripts of interviews have been released which reveal a pattern of disinformation on the part of U.S. government officials.

Oversight activity

Audits
SIGAR's Audits Directorate conducts audits and inspections of reconstruction activities in Afghanistan. These audits are aimed at a range of programs and activities to fulfill SIGAR's legislative mandate. They identify problems associated with the United States' reconstruction effort, and make recommendations to improve efficiency and effectiveness.

SIGAR's audits range from assessments of program direction to narrower examinations of specific contracts or aspects of contract and program management. SIGAR's inspections are quick-impact assessments to determine whether infrastructure projects have been properly constructed, are being used as intended, and can be sustained. SIGAR also conducts forensic reviews of reconstruction funds managed by the Department of Defense, Department of State, and the U.S. Agency for International Development. These forensic reviews identify anomalies that may indicate fraud.

Investigations
The Investigations Directorate conducts criminal and civil investigations of waste, fraud, and abuse relating to programs and operations supported with U.S. funds allocated for the reconstruction of Afghanistan. Results are achieved through criminal prosecutions, civil actions, forfeitures, monetary recoveries and suspension and debarments.

To accomplish its mission, SIGAR has full federal law enforcement authority through its enabling legislation as defined by the National Defense Authorization Act of 2008. SIGAR's Special Agents investigate crimes involving federal procurement fraud, contract fraud, theft, corruption, bribery of government employees and public officials, and a variety of civil matters pertaining to waste and abuse of U.S. taxpayer dollars.

 As of the October 2014 Quarterly Report SIGAR had 322 ongoing investigations.

Special Projects
SIGAR's Special Projects team was created to examine emerging issues and deliver prompt, actionable reports to federal agencies and the Congress. Special Project's reports cover a wide range of programs and activities and the office is made up of auditors, analysts, investigators, lawyers, subject-matter experts and other specialists who can quickly and jointly apply their expertise to emerging problems and questions.

Partners
Under its enabling legislation, SIGAR coordinates with and receives the cooperation of the following organizations while conducting oversight of U.S. reconstruction efforts in Afghanistan:

 Office of the Inspector General, U.S. Department of Defense
 Office of the Inspector General of the Department of State
 Office of Inspector General, U.S. Agency for International Development

SIGAR and the inspectors general for the U.S. Agency for International Development, Defense Department and Department of State have jointly developed and agreed to a strategic plan for oversight of the roughly $104 billion in U.S. funds appropriated for Afghanistan reconstruction.

See also
Afghanistan Papers

External links
Special Inspector General for Afghanistan Official website
Embassy of the United States Kabul, Afghanistan Official website
Appearances by John Sopko on C-SPAN

Recent quarterly reports
 January 30, 2017 Quarterly Report to Congress 
 October 30, 2016 Quarterly Report to Congress

Recent reports
 What We Need to Learn: Lessons from Twenty Years of Afghanistan Reconstruction
 Counternarcotics Police of Afghanistan: U.S. Assistance to Provincial Units Cannot Be Fully Tracked and Formal Capability Assessments Are Needed 
 Pol-i-Charkhi Prison: After 5 Years and $18.5 Million, Renovation Project Remains Incomplete
 Special Report: Poppy Cultivation in Afghanistan, 2012 and 2013
 Inquiry Letter: Communication Trucks
2015: "World's most expensive gas station"

References

Afghanistan Reconstruction
S
2000s in Afghanistan
2010s in Afghanistan
Foreign aid to Afghanistan
Afghanistan–United States relations
Government agencies established in 2008
2008 establishments in Afghanistan
2008 establishments in the United States
War in Afghanistan (2001–2021)